Gazik (also Romanized as Gazīk, Gezīk, and Kazik) is a city in Gazik District of Darmian County, South Khorasan province, Iran. At the 2006 census, its population was 2,773 in 775 households, when it was a village. The following census in 2011 counted 2,934 people in 835 households, by which time the village had been elevated to the status of a city. The latest census in 2016 showed a population of 2,294 people in 679 households.

References 

Darmian County

Cities in South Khorasan Province

Populated places in South Khorasan Province

Populated places in Darmian County